The Ministry of External Relations and International Cooperation is the foreign ministry of the republic of Burundi.

List of ministers 
Source: 
1962–1963: Lorgio Nimubona
1964–1965: Joseph Mbazumutima
1965–1966: Marc Manirakiza
1966–1967: Pié Masumbuko
1967............ Prime Niyongabo
1967............ Michel Micombero
1967–1969: Lazare Ntawurishira
1969–1971: Libère Ndabakwaje
1971–1974: Artémon Simbananiye
1974–1975: Gilles Bimazubute
1975–1976: Melchior Bwakira
1976–1978: Albert Muganga
1978–1982: Édouard Nzambimana
1982–1986: Laurent Nzeyimana
1986–1987: Egide Nkuriyingoma
1987–1992: Cyprien Mbonimpa
1992–1993: Libère Bararunyeretse
1993............ Sylvestre Ntibantunganya
1993–1995: Jean‐Marie Ngendahayo
1995............ Paul Munyembari
1995–1996: Vénérand Bakevyumusaya
1996–1998: Luc Rukingama
1998–2001: Severin Ntahomvukiye
2001–2005: Therence Sinunguruza
2005–2009: Antoinette Batumubwira
2009–2011: Augustin Nsanze
2011–2015: Laurent Kavakure
2015–2018: Alain Aimé Nyamitwe
2018–2020: Ezéchiel Nibigira
2020–present: Albert Shingiro

References

Burundi
Foreign Ministers
Politicians
Foreign ministers of Burundi
1962 establishments in Burundi